Acquaro is a comune (municipality) in the Province of Vibo Valentia in the Italian region Calabria, located about  southwest of Catanzaro and about  southeast of Vibo Valentia.

Geography
Acquaro borders the following municipalities: Arena, Dasà, Dinami, Fabrizia, San Pietro di Caridà.

Demographics

References

External links

 Official website
 Acquaro

Cities and towns in Calabria
Articles which contain graphical timelines